The 1916 Western Reserve football team represented Western Reserve University, now the Case Western Reserve University, during the 1916 college football season.

Schedule

References

Western Reserve
Case Western Reserve Spartans football seasons
Western Reserve football